Byun Byung-joo (or  ; born 26 April 1961) is a former South Korean football player. He played for the South Korea national football team in 1986 and 1990 FIFA World Cup. After his retirement, he managed a K League club Daegu FC from 2007 to 2009.

Style of play
Nicknamed the "Bullet" in South Korea, Byun showed fast dribbles and accurate crosses. He was an important winger for South Korea at the time, although he was criticized for his monotonous pattern.

Career statistics

Club

International

Results list South Korea's goal tally first.

Honours
Yonsei University
Korean President's Cup: 1980

Daewoo Royals
K League 1: 1984, 1987
Korean National Championship: 1989
Korean League Cup runner-up: 1986
Asian Club Championship: 1985–86
Afro-Asian Club Championship: 1986

South Korea
Asian Games: 1986
AFC Asian Cup runner-up: 1988
Dynasty Cup: 1990
Afro-Asian Cup of Nations: 1987

Individual
Korean FA Best XI: 1981
AFC Asian Cup Team of the Tournament: 1988

References

External links
 
 
 

1961 births
Living people
Association football forwards
South Korean footballers
South Korea international footballers
South Korean football managers
Busan IPark players
Ulsan Hyundai FC players
K League 1 players
1984 AFC Asian Cup players
1986 FIFA World Cup players
1988 AFC Asian Cup players
1990 FIFA World Cup players
Sportspeople from Daegu
Daegu FC managers
Yonsei University alumni
Asian Games medalists in football
Footballers at the 1986 Asian Games
Footballers at the 1990 Asian Games
Asian Games gold medalists for South Korea
Asian Games bronze medalists for South Korea
Medalists at the 1986 Asian Games
Medalists at the 1990 Asian Games